Kimberly is a city in Twin Falls County, Idaho, United States. The population was 3,264 at the 2010 census, up from 2,614 in 2000. It is part of the Twin Falls Metropolitan Statistical Area.

Kimberly was founded in 1905. It is named after Peter L. Kimberly, a major investor in the construction of Milner Dam which made commercial irrigation practical in the area.

Geography

Education
Kimberly is served by the Kimberly School District, designated #414. The district contains Kimberly Elementary School, Stricker Elementary School, Kimberly Intermediate School, Kimberly Middle School, and Kimberly High School. The mascot for all schools in the district is the English Bulldog.

The nearest institution of higher education is the College of Southern Idaho, a community college. Situated in Twin Falls, and with a campus in Burley, it provides accessible education for the residents of the Magic Valley.

Demographics

2010 census
As of the census of 2010, there were 3,264 people, 1,123 households, and 835 families residing in the city. The racial makeup of the city was 91.8% White, 0.2% African American, 1.0% Native American, 0.3% Asian, 0.1% Pacific Islander, 4.7% from other races, and 2.0% from two or more races. Hispanic or Latino of any race were 12.5% of the population.

There were 1,123 households, of which 44.3% had children under the age of 18 living with them, 58.3% were married couples living together, 11.1% had a female householder with no husband present, 4.9% had a male householder with no wife present, and 25.6% were non-families. 21.8% of all households were made up of individuals, and 9.3% had someone living alone who was 65 years of age or older. The average household size was 2.87 and the average family size was 3.38.

The median age in the city was 31.9 years. 32.4% of residents were under the age of 18; 8% were between the ages of 18 and 24; 26.8% were from 25 to 44; 21.7% were from 45 to 64; and 11.1% were 65 years of age or older. The gender makeup of the city was 49.6% male and 50.4% female.

2000 census
As of the census of 2000, there were 2,614 people, 916 households, and 690 families residing in the city. The racial makeup of the city was 94.99% White, 0.08% African American, 0.92% Native American, 0.87% Asian, 0.09% Pacific Islander, 1.57% from other races, and 1.95% from two or more races. Hispanic or Latino of any race were 4.93% of the population.

There were 916 households, out of which 40.2% had children under the age of 18 living with them, 68.7% were married couples living together, 19.0% had a female householder with no husband present, and 21.7% were non-families. 21.3% of all households were made up of individuals, and 11.4% had someone living alone who was 65 years of age or older.  The average household size was 2.80 and the average family size was 3.29.

In the city, the population was spread out, with 33.8% under the age of 19, 5.7% from 20 to 24, 28% from 25 to 44, 18.5% from 45 to 64, and 13.9% who were 65 years of age or older.  The median age was 33.5 years. For every 100 females, there were 95 males.  For every 100 females age 18 and over, there were 90.1 males.

The median income for a household in the city was $33,906, and the median income for a family was $39,856. Males had a median income of $29,650 versus $19,757 for females. The per capita income for the city was $13,545.  About 6.7% of families and 8.7% of the population were below the poverty line, including 10.3% of those under age 18 and 6.8% of those age 65 or over.

See also

 List of cities in Idaho

References

External links

 
 Kimberly School District
 Chamber of Commerce - greater Twin Falls area
 University of Idaho - Kimberly Research & Extension Center

Cities in Idaho
Populated places established in 1905
Cities in Twin Falls County, Idaho
Twin Falls, Idaho metropolitan area
1905 establishments in Idaho